Carol Hawkins (born 31 January 1949 in Barnet, Hertfordshire) is an English actress, best known for her various comic roles in numerous TV sitcoms and films in the 1970s and 1980s.

She played the roles of Sharon Eversleigh in the film of the television series Please Sir! and Sandra in the BBC TV series Porridge, and starred in two Carry On films (Carry On Abroad as Marge and Carry On Behind as Sandra).

Biography
Hawkins trained early on as a shorthand typist at Pitman's College, London, but, following some modelling and promotion work, attended the Corona Stage Academy in Hammersmith, London. While still training as an actress, she won the part of Sharon Eversleigh in the film of the popular television series Please Sir!, replacing the departed Penny Spencer. Hawkins went on to play the part of Sharon in The Fenn Street Gang.

She performed in British comedy films of the 1970s, such as two Carry On films: Carry On Abroad (1972), alongside Sally Geeson, and Carry On Behind (1975), alongside Sherrie Hewson. In 1972, she again appeared alongside Geeson in the film adaptation of the popular British television comedy, Bless This House.

She appeared in the Carry On Laughing television series, but she declined to appear in the 1976 Carry On England, due to the excessive nudity. (The part written for Hawkins was played instead by Tricia Newby.) Her other film appearances at that time included principal roles in British comedy films Not Now, Comrade and Confessions of a Pop Performer. At the end of 1975, she appeared in the Porridge episode "No Way Out" as a fake doctor assigned to secretly give Fletcher a false passport.

Hawkins "more or less retired" in 2005, with the aim of devoting more time to spiritual matters and animal care.

Film, television and theatre credits

Filmography
 The Body Stealers (1969) - Paula
 Zeta One (1969) - Zara
 Monique (1970) - Blonde Girl
 When Dinosaurs Ruled the Earth (1970) - Yani
 Up Pompeii (1971) - Nero's Girl (uncredited)
 Please Sir! (1971) - Sharon Eversleigh
 Bless This House (1972) - Kate Baines
 Carry On Abroad (1972) - Marge
 Percy's Progress (1974) - Maggie
 Confessions of a Pop Performer (1975) - Jill Brown
 Carry On Behind (1975) - Sandra
 Not Now, Comrade (1976) - Barbara Wilcox

Selected television credits

 Carry on Again Christmas (1970) - Island Girl
 The Fenn Street Gang (1971–1973) - Sharon Eversleigh / Sharon Duffy
 The Two Ronnies (1974–1983) - various characters
 Porridge (1975) - Sandra
 Carry On Laughing (1975) - Lily
 Whodunnit? (1976) - Vera Moore
 Robin's Nest (1978) - Policewoman Doris Dobbs
 Whodunnit? (1978) - Penny Cooper 
 The Les Dawson Show (1979)
 Blake's 7 (1980) - Kerril
 The Dick Emery Show (1980)
 Together (1980–81)
 C.A.T.S. Eyes (1985) - Sandra Fox
 My Husband and I (1986–1988) - Tracy Cosgrove
 All at No 20 (second series, 1987) - Candy
 The Bill (1997) - Lynn Archer / Mrs. Rose / Mrs. Sterry / Mrs. Giles
 Doctors (2004) - Pam Jordan

Selected theatre credits

 Wait Until Dark (1975)
 Sextet (1977–78, Criterion Theatre)
 Time and Time Again (1978)
 Bedroom Farce (1979)
 The Undertaking (1980, Fortune Theatre)
 Dirty Linen (1980, Arts Theatre, London)
 Run for Your Wife (1983, Shaftesbury Theatre; 1989, Whitehall Theatre)
 See How They Run (1984, Shaftesbury Theatre)
 Wife Begins at Forty (1985, Ambassadors Theatre)

References

External links
 
 Carol Hawkins' official website

1949 births
Living people
English film actresses
English stage actresses
English television actresses
People from Chipping Barnet
Actresses from Hertfordshire